Sidi Azeiz Airfield, or Sidi Azeis is an abandoned World War II military airfield in the eastern desert of Libya. It was located near the Egypt–Libya border near Jabbanat Sidi, about 100 km east of Tobruk. German Coordinates are given as 

It was used by the United States Army Air Force Ninth Air Force during the Western Desert Campaign (named due to the stretch of the Sahara in Egypt being called the Western Desert) by the British Eighth Army, which the 57th Fighter Group, flew P-40 Warhawks  from on 12–13 November 1942.

The airfield was likely a compacted desert dirt flight strip, and was abandoned as the Allied forces moved west towards Tobruk. Close examination aerial photography of the hard desert about 10 miles west of Burdi shows some evidence of disturbance which could indicate where it existed.

See also
 List of World War II North Africa Airfields
 No. 451 Squadron RAAF
 No. 450 Squadron RAAF
 Operation Crusader

References

 Maurer, Maurer. Air Force Combat Units of World War II. Maxwell AFB, Alabama: Office of Air Force History, 1983. .

External links
 German Map 
 cleared land at German Coord. 

Airfields of the United States Army Air Forces in Libya
World War II airfields in Libya